Lemont is a village located in Cook, DuPage, and Will counties in the U.S. state of Illinois, and is a south-west suburb of Chicago.  The population was 17,629 as of the 2020 census. The village is situated on a hillside along the south banks of the Des Plaines River. It overlooks Waterfall Glen's Midwestern Bluff Savanna on the opposite side. Lemont is home to Argonne National Laboratory and other heavy industrial sites, and has a substantial European immigrant population.

History

Before white settlers arrived in Lemont, Native Americans traveled the Des Plaines River in birch bark canoes on trading trips between the Mississippi River and Lake Michigan. The native Potawatomi lived off the land in this area, directly using natural resources for food, shelter, clothing and medicine. In the 18th century, French voyageurs traveled down the Des Plaines River, trading Native Americans metal, beads and cloth for animal furs.

Lemont was originally known as Keepataw (after a Potawatomi chief) and a post office was established in 1840 as Keepatau. After that, it was named Athens and then Palmyra. The name Lemont (literally, 'the mountain' in French) was chosen in 1850 at the suggestion of Lemuel Brown, the postmaster and justice of the peace, or perhaps by his brother Nathaniel Brown.

Established in 1836, the village of Lemont stands as one of the oldest American communities in northeastern Illinois. It is historically significant for its role in transforming the northern region of the state from a sparsely settled frontier to a commercial, agricultural, and industrial region that supplied Chicago and areas beyond with commodities. Lemont is also unique in boasting an authentic historic district that remains intact and has been continually used since the 19th century. In 2016, the Lemont Downtown Historic District was listed on the National Register of Historic Places.

Both Lemont's history and architectural uniqueness connect to the Illinois and Michigan Canal (I&M Canal). Construction of the I&M Canal began in 1837 and stands as one of the last major canal undertakings in the United States (the Hennepin Canal opened in 1907). When it was completed in 1848, it provided a continuous waterway stretching from New York (through the Erie Canal, Lake Erie, Lake Huron and Lake Michigan to Chicago, then through the I&M Canal for  entering the Illinois River at LaSalle, Illinois, to the Mississippi River, to New Orleans) to the Gulf of Mexico.

Immigrant workers, mostly Irish, settled in Lemont to work on the canal and later moved along the corridor of the canal, improving farms within the many communities that sprang up along it. They also were for the most part responsible for the many Lemont brothels during that time.

In digging, workers discovered Lemont yellow dolomite, a harder and finer grained version of limestone. This delayed digging of the canal, but was the start of the area's second industry, quarrying. By the mid-19th century, limestone quarrying took over as the main economic factor in Lemont and sustained its growth. The town's important major buildings were faced with the Lemont limestone, abundant in local quarries. Today, 38 of those buildings remain as the Lemont downtown district. Lemont limestone was used to build the Chicago Water Tower, a building that "gained special significance as one of the few buildings to survive the destructive path of the Great Chicago Fire of 1871". In the early years, this stone was known as "Athens Marble" as a nod to its place of origin. An 1859 item in the Chicago Daily Tribune had this to say: “The Athens and DesPlaines quarries, situated on the Illinois and Michigan canal, embrace 335 acres of the finest stone in the West, known as “Athens Marble”.  This stone has a high reputation for color, durability and beauty, which renders it quite an article of commerce”.

Cargo and passengers were transported on the I&M until the early 20th century, when the wider, deeper Chicago Sanitary and Ship Canal was built parallel to it. The Sanitary Canal is still used today as part of the Illinois Waterway system.

Lemont's motto is "Village of Faith", and its church spires reflect the many ethnic groups who came here to quarry stone, dig the Sanitary and Ship Canal and work in other industries.

Lemont is credited with being the largest recruiting station for the Union Army during the American Civil War, and the Old Stone Church, built in 1861 of limestone, was used as a recruiting depot. It served as the Lemont Methodist Episcopal Church for 100 years, from 1861 until 1970, when it became home to the Lemont Area Historical Society. The oldest building in Lemont, it now serves as a museum and is listed on the National Register of Historic Places.

During the Civil War, Lemont was required to sign up 33 soldiers, the village recruited 293 soldiers; only 63 returned. The Lemont Civil War Memorial Committee was formed to build a memorial to honor Lemont's Civil War veterans. The monument was dedicated in 2008 in Legion Park at the east end of Main Street, opposite the Metra Station. Of the 293 soldiers sent to fight in the war, only 243 names of the enlisted soldiers are known. Among them is Cpl. John Warden, the only Lemont resident ever awarded the Medal of Honor.

By 1854, railroads transported goods faster than water, and the I&M became obsolete as Lemont evolved into a railroad community; the village was incorporated on June 9, 1873.

Increasingly, the canal was used to carry wastes away from Chicago. In 1900, the larger Sanitary and Ship Canal went into operation, carrying both wastes and larger, more modern barges. All use of the I&M Canal ended in 1933, with the opening of the canal's modern successor - the Illinois Waterway.

By about 1920, the quarries declined as styles changed and builders began to use Bedford limestone from Indiana and less expensive materials like concrete.

During World War II, the Metallurgical Laboratory of the University of Chicago moved into Red Gate Woods to carry out Enrico Fermi's work on nuclear reactors for the Manhattan Project. After the war, Argonne National Laboratory was designated as the first national laboratory in the United States on July 1, 1946. 

In 1984, President Ronald Reagan signed legislation establishing the Illinois & Michigan Canal National Heritage Corridor as the nation's first National Heritage Corridor. The status recognizes the historic importance of this region and the waterway that connected Lake Michigan and the Illinois River. Today, it is a  cultural park between Chicago and LaSalle/Peru, representing an ongoing partnership between the public and private sectors created to achieve a successful mixture of preservation, public use and industrial activity.

Sacred architecture is a strong suit of Lemont, whose skyline is dominated by two landmark religious edifices:  the Hindu Temple of Greater Chicago and SS. Cyril and Methodius church in the Polish Cathedral style. Both are situated on the sides of hills, giving an even more dramatic backdrop to their monumental architecture.

Tornadoes
On June 13, 1976, at 5:18 PM, a killer tornado struck Lemont and took three lives. 23 were injured, 87 homes were destroyed and 82 more were damaged. Damage to the high school alone was estimated at $500,000. Many people reported watching neighbors' homes explode, implode, shattering before their eyes. Cited as an unusual tornado, it backed up on its path before heading North, somewhat parallel to its path of origin. See Tornadoes of 1976 for more information on the outbreak.

On March 27, 1991, Lemont was again hit by a tornado. See Tornadoes of 1991 for more information on the outbreak.

Geography

The village has 10 exclaves. Many unincorporated areas of Downers Grove Township on the DuPage County side of the river have a Lemont street address. Main Street in Downtown Downers Grove eventually becomes State Street in Downtown Lemont.

Demographics
As of the 2020 census there were 17,629 people, 5,911 households, and 4,606 families residing in the village. The racial makeup of the village was 89.29% White, 0.91% African American, 0.11% Native American, 2.45% Asian, 0.03% Pacific Islander, 1.38% from other races, and 5.83% from two or more races. Hispanic or Latino of any race were 7.12% of the population.

There were 5,911 households, out of which 68.65% had children under the age of 18 living with them, 67.64% were married couples living together, 7.58% had a female householder with no husband present, and 22.08% were non-families. 18.74% of all households were made up of individuals, and 11.06% had someone living alone who was 65 years of age or older. The average household size was 3.27 and the average family size was 2.85.

The village's age distribution consisted of 25.1% under the age of 18, 6.5% from 18 to 24, 20.5% from 25 to 44, 29.6% from 45 to 64, and 18.3% who were 65 years of age or older. The median age was 43.5 years. For every 100 females, there were 100.8 males. For every 100 females age 18 and over, there were 94.7 males.

The median income for a household in the village was $114,509, and the median income for a family was $133,456. Males had a median income of $75,542 versus $43,283 for females. The per capita income for the village was $45,675. About 4.4% of families and 5.1% of the population were below the poverty line, including 5.9% of those under age 18 and 5.3% of those age 65 or over.

Sports
In 2006, the Lemont Little League All-Star team traveled to the 60th Little League World Series in South Williamsport, Pennsylvania. The team, which represented the Great Lakes region, received 4th place after losing to the Beaverton, Oregon, team and was the only team to beat the champions from Georgia. Upon returning home, the Lemont team received a parade down State Street in honor of their achievements.

The BMW Championship (PGA Tour), and the prior Western Open, were held in unincorporated Lemont township between 1991 and 2007, and 2009 to 2011. Cog Hill Golf & Country Club has subsequently rejected incorporation into Lemont and has agreed to incorporate into Palos Park. The tournament was played at Cog Hill Golf & Country Club, which was founded in 1927. The Ruffled Feathers Golf Club is located in Lemont.

In 2008, the girls 11-year-old Lemont Little League All-Star team traveled to Beardstown, Illinois, for the state tournament and won the state title.

In 2009, a new group of 11-year-old All-Stars from Lemont won the State Championship for a second consecutive year.

The Lemont High School varsity cheerleading team placed first at the IHSA State Championships in the years 2009, 2010, 2011, 2014, and 2017.

In 2020, the Lemont High School wrestling program won the 2020 IHSA Class 2A Dual Team State Championship and set a school record for wins.

Education
Three National Blue Ribbon Schools are located in Lemont, recognized by the US Department of Education for excellence in student achievement. Lemont High School received the Blue Ribbon award in 2017. Saints Cyril and Methodius School received the Blue Ribbon award in 2019. 

Public schools in Lemont include:
 River Valley Elementary School
 Oakwood Elementary School
 Old Quarry Middle School
 Lemont High School

Private/Parochial Schools
 St. Alphonsus/St. Patrick
 SS. Cyril & Methodius:
 Everest Academy
Montessori School of Lemont
Žiburėlis Lithuanian Montessori School
Polska Szkoła  Jana Pawła II Polish School

Media

Productions filmed in Lemont include:
 Save the Last Dance
The Hunter (1980)
Straight Talk (1992)
Children on Their Birthdays (2002)
Witless Protection
Chain Reaction (1996)

Infrastructure

Transportation 
Lemont has a station on Metra's Heritage Corridor, which provides weekday rail service between Joliet and Chicago Union Station.

In 2007, the Interstate 355 tollway extension opened, providing Lemont with more direct access to the Chicago expressway system. An interchange is located on 127th Street.

Notable people 

 Diablo Cody, Academy Award-winning writer of the film Juno, raised in Lemont.
 Scott Darling, goaltender for Carolina Hurricanes
 Clayton Fejedelem, safety for the Miami Dolphins and [Cincinnati Bengals].
 Coby Fleener, former tight end for the New Orleans Saints and Indianapolis Colts, born in Lemont.
 Garrett Gilkey, former NFL offensive lineman, born in Lemont.
 Steve Grand, country/rock singer.
 Tyler Jay, pitcher, first-round pick of 2015 MLB Draft.
 Michael Katzban, state legislator in Wisconsin, born in Lemont.
 David Molk, former center for the Philadelphia Eagles and San Diego Chargers.
 Jerry Taft, weathercaster for ABC 7 news in Chicago. 
 Christian Vande Velde, cyclist, the fourth place 2008 Tour de France finisher, born in Lemont.
 Marius Katiliškis, prominent Lithuanian exile novelist.

Notes

References

External links

 
1836 establishments in Illinois
Chicago metropolitan area
Populated places established in 1836
Villages in Cook County, Illinois
Villages in DuPage County, Illinois
Villages in Will County, Illinois
Villages in Illinois